Mexico–Saint Vincent and the Grenadines relations are the diplomatic relations between the United Mexican States and Saint Vincent and the Grenadines. Both nations are members of the Association of Caribbean States, Organization of American States and the United Nations.

History
Mexico and Saint Vincent and the Grenadines established diplomatic relations on 31 July 1990. Since the establishment of diplomatic relations; relations between both nations have taken place primarily in multilateral forums. In March 2002, Vincentian Prime Minister Ralph Gonsalves paid a visit to Mexico to attend the Monterrey Consensus in the Mexican city of Monterrey. In April 2005, Prime Minister Gonsalves paid an official visit to Mexico and met with Mexican President Vicente Fox. During the visit, bot leaders signed an agreement for scientific and technical cooperation.

In April 2008, Prime Minister Gonsalves returned to Mexico for an official visit. Along with Mexican Felipe Calderón, both leaders held a brief interview and issued a press release in which they pledged to intensify the relationship in the field of combating drug trafficking and organized crime.

In February 2014, Mexican Foreign Minister José Antonio Meade visited Saint Vincent and the Grenadines to review the damages caused by heavy rains in December 2013. During his visit, Foreign Minister Meade met and interviewed with Prime Minister Ralph Gonsalves and with Foreign Minister Camillo Gonsalves. In April 2014, Mexico granted a donation of US$500,000 dollars that were used for the reconstruction of areas affected by the storms. In May 2014, Vincentian Foreign Minister Camillo Gonsalves traveled to Mexico to attend the Mexico-Caribbean Community summit in Mérida. In June 2017, Vincentian Foreign Minister Camillo Gonsalves paid a visit to Mexico to attend the 47th General Assembly of the Organization of American States in Cancún.

Each year, the Mexican government offers scholarships for nationals of Saint Vincent and the Grenadines  to study postgraduate studies at Mexican higher education institutions.

High-level visits
High-level visits from Mexico to Saint Vincent and the Grenadines
 Foreign Minister José Antonio Meade (2014)

High-level visits from Saint Vincent and the Grenadines to Mexico
 Prime Minister Ralph Gonsalves (2002, 2005, 2008, 2021)
 Foreign Minister Camillo Gonsalves (2014, 2017)

Trade
In 2018, trade between Mexico and Saint Vincent and the Grenadines totaled US$1.6 million. Mexico's main exports to Saint Vincent and the Grenadines include: cylinders; control units and adapters; pulp; cellulose; and machinery and stoves. Saint Vincent and the Grenadines's main exports to Mexico include: batteries and electric batteries; and pens. Mexican multinational company Cemex operates in Saint Vincent and the Grenadines.

Diplomatic missions
 Mexico is accredited to Saint Vincent and the Grenadines from its embassy in Castries, Saint Lucia and maintains an honorary consulate in Kingstown.
 Saint Vincent and the Grenadines is accredited to Mexico from its embassy in Washington, D.C., United States.

References 

Saint Vincent and the Grenadines
Mexico